Antal Bánkuti (1 June 1923 – 21 July 2001) was a Hungarian basketball player. He competed in the men's tournament at the 1948 Summer Olympics.

References

External links
 

1923 births
2001 deaths
Hungarian men's basketball players
Olympic basketball players of Hungary
Basketball players at the 1948 Summer Olympics
People from Osijek-Baranja County